Frederick Francis Dunkelman (5 or 19 February 1920 – 23 July 2010) was a British ice hockey player who competed at the 1948 Winter Olympics. In St. Moritz he was a member of the British team that placed fifth in the ice hockey tournament. He was born in East Ham, Greater London and was a member of the Harringay Greyhounds. In 1946 he founded Dunkelman & Son Ltd, now known as Dasco Shoe Care, in Battersea to manufacture and sell ice hockey sticks, but moved into the shoe trade in 1950 and to a new location in Desborough in 1969. He retired from the business after 61 years in 2007 and died in his sleep on 23 July 2010.

References

External links

1920 births
2010 deaths
English ice hockey players
Ice hockey players at the 1948 Winter Olympics
Olympic ice hockey players of Great Britain
People from East Ham